Aeroflot Flight 315 (1960) was a regularly scheduled passenger flight operated by Aeroflot from Vnukovo International Airport in  Moscow to Lviv Airport in Lviv, Ukraine. On 26 February 1960, the An-10 operating this flight crashed short of the airport runway while on final approach. 24 passengers and eight crew members were killed, one passenger survived. 

The Air Accident Investigation Commission concluded the cause of the accident was a combination of design flaw and icing.

Accident
Flight 315 departed Vnukovo Airport at 14:38 Moscow time, and was cleared to climb to 7,000 meters. At 16:35 as the airliner approached Lviv the crew received clearance to descend to 4,000 meters. Weather was reported as a cloud base of 150-200 meters in icing conditions with visibility at three km. The descent was normal and the pilot reported reaching the marker beacon at an altitude of 200 meters, the flight was then cleared to land. When the aircraft penetrated the cloud base the crew switched to visual flight rules (VFR). While descending through 95 meters the flaps were set to 45 degrees and the Antonov began a rapid pitch down. The crew briefly regained control but the nose pitched down again and at 16:57 impacted the ground 1,400 meters short of the runway with pitch down attitude of 20-25 degrees.

Aircraft
Construction of the AN-10 involved, serial number 9401801-18-01, was completed at the Voronezh aircraft factory on 24 January 1960 and it was transferred to the civil air fleet. At the time of the accident, the aircraft had sustained a total of 109 flight hours.

Investigation
Because the aircraft was in operation for only six days after release from the factory the Air Accident Investigation Commission decided it was unlikely that mechanical failure was the root cause of the accident. The evidence gathered from the investigation of Aeroflot Flight 315 (1959) on 26 February 1960 three months earlier was further scrutinized. Testing eventually revealed that icing of the horizontal stabilizer created a supercritical angle of attack, that caused a sudden pitch down of the aircraft when the flaps are lowered to the maximum setting of 45 degrees. A contributing factor was the speed with which the flaps deployed. 35 degrees in eight seconds was deemed disproportionally rapid. To abate this concern ice protection systems for the stabilizer were improved and selection of flaps beyond 15 degrees in known icing conditions was disallowed.

See also
Aeroflot accidents and incidents
Aeroflot accidents and incidents in the 1960s

References

November 1960 events in Europe
Aviation accidents and incidents in 1960
Aviation accidents and incidents in the Soviet Union
315 (1960)
1960 in the Soviet Union
Accidents and incidents involving the Antonov An-10